Apco Aviation (usually styled APCO), is an Israeli aircraft manufacturer based in Caesarea and founded in 1982 by Anatoly Cohn. The company specializes in the design and manufacture of paragliders and at one time also made hang gliders and ultralight aircraft. It also manufacturers paraglider harnesses, the Mayday line of parachute rescue systems and other accessories.

Cohn started building his first prototype hang glider in 1974. In 1978 he produced his first high performance hang glider and in 1982 started Apco Aviation. The company started producing paragliders in 1986 and has built more than 40 different models. It produces a wide range of paragliders that has included the competition Apco Simba, the Prima trainer, the Fiesta beginner glider, the intermediate Presta and Keara.

The company occupies a  factory in northern Israel that was specifically built for Apco. It employs 60 people there.

In 1991 the Apco HiLite III set a World Distance Record for paragliders. The Apco Extra was also later flown to another  World Distance Record for paragliders. In 2000 the Apco Futura set a world record, the company's tenth world record. The company's paragliders hold eleven world records.

Aircraft 

Summary of aircraft built by Apco Aviation:

Apco Activa
Apco Air Xtreme
Apco Allegra
Apco Bagheera
Apco Enigma
Apco Extra
Apco Fiesta
Apco Force
Apco Fun
Apco Futura
Apco Game
Apco HiLite
Apco Hybrid
Apco Karma
Apco Keara
Apco Lift
Apco NRG
Apco Play
Apco Presta
Apco Prima
Apco Salsa
Apco Santana
Apco Sierra
Apco Simba
Apco Speedstar
Apco Starlite
Apco System K
Apco Tetra
Apco Tigra
Apco Thrust
Apco Twister
Apco Vista
Apco Zefira

And "Mayday" series of rescues parachutes...

References

External links

Aircraft manufacturers of Israel
Paramotors
Hang gliders
Paragliders
Ultralight aircraft
Manufacturing companies established in 1982
Israeli companies established in 1982